Session Manager Subsystem, or , is a component of the Microsoft Windows NT family of operating systems, starting in Windows NT 3.1.  It is executed during the startup process of those operating systems (it is the first user-mode process started by the kernel), at which time it performs the following tasks:
Creates environment variables.
Starts the kernel and user modes of the Win32 subsystem. Any other subsystems listed in the Required value of the  Registry key are also started.
Creates DOS device mappings (e.g. CON:, NUL:, AUX:, COM1:, COM2:, COM3:, COM4:, PRN:, LPT1:, LPT2:, LPT3:, and drive letters) listed at the  registry key. This can be used to create permanent subst drives.
Creates virtual memory paging files.
Starts , the Windows logon manager.

After the boot process is finished, the program resides in memory and can be seen running in the Windows Task Manager. If the processes do not end in an expected fashion,  may hang the system, or a bugcheck will occur. It also initiates new user sessions when needed.

The Local Session Manager Service sends requests to SMSS through the Asynchronous Local Inter-Process Communication (ALPC) port  to start new sessions.

See also 
 List of Microsoft Windows components
  — a similar process in Unix-style systems

References

Further reading
 Sessions, Desktops and Windows Stations
 Impact of Session 0 Isolation on Services and Drivers in Windows 
 Session 0 Isolation - Windows 7 - Microsoft

Windows NT architecture